The  2011 Beijing Guoan F.C. season  was their 8th consecutive season in the Chinese Super League, established in the 2004, and 21st consecutive season in the top flight of Chinese football. They competed at the Chinese Super League and Chinese FA Cup.

First team
As of July 8, 2011

Transfers

Winter

In:

Out:

Summer

In:

 
 

Out:

Competitions

Chinese Super League

Chinese FA Cup

References

Beijing Guoan F.C. seasons
Chinese football clubs 2011 season